Mickaël James (born September 28, 1976 in Niort, France) is a former professional footballer who played as a striker.

See also
Football in France
List of football clubs in France

References

External links
Mickaël James profile at chamoisfc79.fr

1976 births
Living people
French footballers
Association football forwards
Chamois Niortais F.C. players
Angoulême Charente FC players
Ligue 2 players
Thouars Foot 79 players